Shinka-ron is Akinori Nakagawa's box set DVD.

Disc one

Himself is a musical based on the William Shakespeare play Hamlet. All twenty-four musical numbers are written by Akinori Nakagawa.

Casts
Akinori Nakagawa
Keigo Yoshino
Shinya Nino
Nozomi Ando
Kentaro Hayami
Ken Nakagawa
Hikari Ono
Chiaki Kosaka
Tetsuro Sagawa

Disc two

Blue Dream is an Akinori Nakagawa's musical. The play is consist of three part.

Cast
Akinori Nakagawa

Track listing

Disc three
Title : Special X
The disc contains Akinori Nakagawa's interview about Blue Dream and Himself.

External links
Official Discography 

Akinori Nakagawa albums
2007 compilation albums